James Huang (born January 11, 1977) is an American film and television actor and producer/director.

Biography
Huang (pronounced: "Hwong") was born in Queens, New York City, the youngest of ten children (five boys/five girls). He graduated from West Windsor - Plainsboro High School South in 1994. He attended Rutgers University – New Brunswick on a scholarship, majoring in theater and cinema. He graduated in 1998.

Career
Huang's first job after graduating from Rutgers was as a resident actor in the George Street Playhouse. After starting his career in New York, he moved to Los Angeles to pursue a permanent film/television career. He worked in several areas of film, television, commercials and print modeling. He often plays police officers, FBI agents, and military men and is a 3rd degree black belt in Taekwondo.

As a commercial actor and model, he has appeared in over forty television commercials and print advertisements ranging from the UPS man to a Mervyns clothing model. He has appeared in over forty five television shows including a memorable fight scene with Lost star Matthew Fox, The Unit, Shark, Las Vegas, NCIS and Law & Order, Boldly Going Nowhere, Private Practice, Law & Order: Los Angeles, and recurring roles in ABC's Women's Murder Club and TNT's Rizzoli & Isles, and General Hospital.  He has also appeared in sitcoms including Will & Grace and The New Adventures of Old Christine. Feature film roles include the DreamWorks feature film, Eagle Eye and the Disney/Bruckheimer feature film G-Force, and the 2010 alien invasion film Skyline. He plays Marcus, alongside Bill Paxton, in the 2014 film Nightcrawler, starring Jake Gyllenhaal. Recent guest starring television appearances include "Castle (TV series)" on ABC and "NCIS: Los Angeles" on CBS.

As a director and producer, he won a Prism Award in 2007 for the MTV documentary True Life: I'm Addicted to Crystal Meth. He has written, produced and directed independent narrative films that have played in festivals across the country through his production company Yellow Sun Films.

James and his wife, Elizabeth Sandy (married 2011), both star in the romantic comedy Starting from Scratch which Huang also wrote and directed and landed a distribution deal with MouseTrap Films through their platform Film Festival Flix. The feature film won Best Comedy at the Asians on Film Festival, won Best Editing and the Vanguard Award for Best Ensemble Cast from the Independent Filmmakers Showcase Los Angeles, an Honorable Mention for Best Film at the New Jersey Film Festival, and won top honors for Best Feature Film at the DisOrient Film Festival. They relocated in 2020 to Melbourne, Australia where he continues to act and run his Acting studio, The Hollywood Actor Lab.

References

Living people
American male television actors
American people of Taiwanese descent
Rutgers University alumni
American screenwriters
American film producers
1977 births